Avondale School can refer to:

Canada 
 Avondale Alternative Secondary School in Toronto, Ontario

Oceania 
Avondale College in Auckland, New Zealand
Avondale School in Cooranbong, Australia
Avondale University College in New South Wales, Australia

United Kingdom 
Stockport Academy in Cheadle Heath, formerly known as Avondale High School

United States 
Avondale Elementary School District near Phoenix, Arizona
Avondale High School in Dekalb County, Georgia
Avondale High School in Auburn Hills, Michigan
Avondale School District in Michigan